Ratikhera  is a village in Ashoknagar district of Madhya Pradesh state of India.

References

Villages in Ashoknagar district